Alan Hammond (19 March 1912 – 13 May 1981) was a former Australian rules footballer who played for the Collingwood Football Club in the Victorian Football League (VFL).

Notes

External links 

		
Alan Hammond's profile at Collingwood Forever

1912 births
1981 deaths
Australian rules footballers from Victoria (Australia)
Collingwood Football Club players